Zhang Guolin (born 14 March 1985 in Zhuanghe, Dalian, Liaoning) is a male Chinese rower, who competed for Team China at the 2008 Summer Olympics (in the men's lightweight double sculls) and 2012 Summer Olympics (in the men's lightweight four).

In the 2008 Summer Olympics, he came 5th place, making him the best-performing contestant from Asia.

Major performances
2003 World U23 Championships – 2nd LM2X
2006 National Championships – 2nd lightweight fours
2007 National Water Sports Games – 1st LM2X
2008 World Cup Munich – 4th LM2X
2008 Olympic Games – 5th LM2X
2009 National Games – 2nd LM4-
2010 Asian Games – 1st LM2X
2011 World Rowing Championships – 4th LM4X
2012 World Cup – 1st

References

1985 births
Living people
Chinese male rowers
Olympic rowers of China
Rowers at the 2008 Summer Olympics
Rowers at the 2012 Summer Olympics
Asian Games medalists in rowing
Rowers at the 2010 Asian Games
Asian Games gold medalists for China
Medalists at the 2010 Asian Games
Rowers from Dalian